Ajit Sharma  is a businessman turned Indian politician belonging to Indian National Congress. He is a member of the Bihar Legislative Assembly. He won from Bhagalpur (Vidhan Sabha constituency) in 2014, 2015 and 2020 Bihar Legislative Assembly election. He is the current Congress Legislative Party leader in Bihar Legislative Assembly.

Personal life

His daughters Neha Sharma and Aisha Sharma are Bollywood actresses.

References

People from Bhagalpur
Living people
Bihar MLAs 2015–2020
Bihar MLAs 2020–2025
Indian National Congress politicians from Bihar
1954 births